The 2014–15 Towson Tigers women's basketball team represents Towson University during the 2014–15 NCAA Division I women's basketball season. The Tigers, led by second year head coach Niki Reid Geckeler, play their home games at SECU Arena and were members of the Colonial Athletic Association. They finished the season 11–21, 6–12 in CAA play to finish in eighth place. They advanced to the quarterfinals of the CAA women's tournament where they lost to James Madison.

Roster

Schedule

|-
!colspan=9 style="background:#000000; color:#FFD600;"| Exhibition

|-
!colspan=9 style="background:#000000; color:#FFD600;"| Regular season

|-
!colspan=9 style="background:#000000; color:#FFD600;"| CAA Tournament

References

Towson Tigers women's basketball seasons
Towson